The Scudder Falls Bridge is a toll bridge that carries Interstate 295 (I-295) over the Delaware River, connecting Lower Makefield Township in Bucks County, Pennsylvania, with the Scudders Falls section of Ewing Township in Mercer County, New Jersey, United States. It is maintained by the Delaware River Joint Toll Bridge Commission (DRJTBC). The original bridge was a plate girder bridge constructed from 1958 to 1961, and the current structure is a box-girder bridge that opened in 2019. Previously, the bridge was a toll-free crossing. However, this changed on July 14, 2019, when an all-electronic toll was levied for Pennsylvania-bound traffic; the toll can be paid using E-ZPass or Toll-by-Plate.

A $534 million replacement project for the bridge was completed, which involved widening I-295 in the area from four lanes to eight, and reconstruction of the interchanges at both ends of the bridge. The first span of the new bridge opened to Pennsylvania-bound traffic on July 10, 2019. New Jersey-bound traffic was moved onto the new span on July 24, 2019, and demolition of the old span began afterwards. As well, a shared-use path for bicycle and foot-traffic opened on November 16, 2021.

Name
The Scudder Falls Bridge derives its name from Richard Betts Scudder, who according to the Long Island Genealogy Surname Database, died in 1754 at "Scudders Falls, Hunterdon County" (portions of Mercer County were part of Hunterdon County until 1838). One of Richard Scudder's ancestors from Kent, England, was named Henry Skudder. The k in the surname apparently became a c at some point in time, helping to give the falls and modern-day bridge its name. The "falls" (really just an area of rapids) are located about 1/2 mile north of the bridge, and the entrance to the Delaware and Raritan Canal State Park just north of the bridge is signed as the "Scudders Falls" unit. The extra s at the end of "Scudders" was dropped to make pronunciation of the bridge's name easier.

Original bridge

The DRJTBC was responsible for the construction of the bridge, while New Jersey and Pennsylvania built the approaches to each side. Because the bridge was not originally part of the Interstate Highway System, the cost of construction was not 90% covered by the federal government. Instead, they covered 50% of the cost of the new span, while New Jersey and Pennsylvania paid the remaining 50% of the total bill, as with an ordinary U.S. Highway route.

In April 1958, the location of the future Scudder Falls Bridge was approved with little opposition. Construction, overseen by the DRJTBC, began in May of the same year and was completed in 1959. The new bridge, which had cost $8.4 million, opened to traffic on June 22, 1961. The Yardley-Wilburtha Bridge was rebuilt as a temporary crossing before the Scudder Falls Bridge began being built. It was completely torn down in 1961 when the Scudder Falls Bridge opened. The bridge was built using two-span continuous steel-plate girders. Opposing traffic was separated by a Jersey barrier. The Scudder Falls Bridge originally carried I-95 over the Delaware River. In March 2018, I-95 was renumbered to I-295 across the bridge as part of the Pennsylvania Turnpike/Interstate 95 Interchange Project that completed the gap in I-95.

Replacement bridge

Starting in 2003, the DRJTBC began working on plans to replace the bridge, improve the safety and traffic flow of its two immediately adjoining interchanges (Taylorsville Road in Pennsylvania and Route 29 in New Jersey), and widen the Pennsylvania approach to the bridge (from four lanes to six). The project was deemed necessary because the original configurations of the bridge, interchanges and roadways suffered from numerous inadequacies. The closely spaced interchanges on both ends of the bridge required the addition of acceleration and deceleration lanes (the Commission refers to them as "auxiliary lanes"), of which there were previously none.

According to the DRJTBC's 2002 Southerly Crossings Corridor Study, the Scudder Falls Bridge carried roughly 55,000 vehicles per day (traffic counts have increased since then), well beyond the design load of 40,000 vehicles per day. By 2030, traffic volumes were expected to increase by 35%, the equivalent of 19,000 additional vehicles. This amount of traffic would require two to perhaps four additional travel lanes (24 to 48 additional feet of roadway width).

Also mentioned by the 2002 study is that Scudder Falls Bridge had been given a Level of Service (LOS) grade of "F" during peak rush hours and afternoons. This grade denotes the worst service conditions and the highest congestion rate. At times other than brief rush hour delays, traffic traveling the bridge was relatively light. The condition of the bridge had also been a growing concern in the following years. Even though routine inspections had not revealed any serious structural problems, the bridge was over 50 years old and was likely deteriorating rapidly. The bridge was also similar in design to the Mianus River Bridge in Greenwich, Connecticut, which suffered a fatal collapse in 1983.

The replacement bridge consists of six through-travel lanes and three auxiliary lanes (two in the New Jersey-bound direction and one in the Pennsylvania-bound direction) to handle traffic accelerating onto the bridge or decelerating off of the bridge at the two closely spaced adjoining interchanges. It also has shoulders to handle vehicle breakdowns and emergencies, with the two inside shoulders being wide enough to handle proposed regional bus-rapid transit service. A bicycle/pedestrian facility was added to the upstream side of the new bridge. On July 10, 2019, the upstream span of the new bridge opened to Pennsylvania-bound traffic. New Jersey-bound traffic remained on the original span until July 24, after which demolition of the original span began and construction of the new downstream span will begin.

To help finance this multi-faceted improvement project, the DRJTBC voted in late December 2009 to establish tolling at the crossing. Tolls were implemented on July 14, 2019, four days after the new bridge span opened to traffic. Tolls are collected from traffic crossing into Pennsylvania, with an all-electronic toll gantry consisting of E-ZPass transponder readers and high-resolution cameras (no cash toll booths) constructed on the bridge.  The DRJTBC has stated that the introduction of cashless tolling at the bridge is necessary to help finance its capital program, of which the multi-faceted Scudder Falls Bridge Replacement Project would be its largest single construction initiative in its 75-year history.  The commission is funded solely by tolls collected at its eight current toll bridges; it receives no gasoline tax revenues or state or federal support.  Commission executives have stated that it would be unfair to have the project financed solely by motorists using its other toll bridges, individuals who have been subsidizing the Scudder Falls facility already for more than two decades.

The shared-use path on the bridge is the only one of its kind across the Delaware River crossing from Pennsylvania-to-New Jersey, in that it allows cyclists to ride across without dismounting. This bridge also restores pedestrian/cyclist access to cross the bridge in the Yardley area, which had been previously unavailable since the 1955 destruction of the Yardley-Wilburtha bridge.

See also
 
 
 
 
 List of crossings of the Delaware River

References

External links

DRJTBC: Scudder Falls Toll Supported Bridge
Scudder Falls Bridge Improvement Project

Delaware River Joint Toll Bridge Commission
1961 establishments in New Jersey
1961 establishments in Pennsylvania
Bridges completed in 1961
Bridges in Mercer County, New Jersey
Bridges over the Delaware River
Ewing Township, New Jersey
Interstate 95
Bridges in Bucks County, Pennsylvania
Road bridges in New Jersey
Road bridges in Pennsylvania
Bridges on the Interstate Highway System
Steel bridges in the United States
Plate girder bridges in the United States
Interstate vehicle bridges in the United States
Tolled sections of Interstate Highways